Illness as Metaphor is a 1978 work of critical theory by Susan Sontag, in which she challenged the victim-blaming in the language that is often used to describe diseases and the people affected by them.

Teasing out the similarities between public perspectives on cancer (the paradigmatic disease of the 20th century before the appearance of AIDS), and tuberculosis (the symbolic illness of the 19th century), Sontag showed that both diseases were popularly associated with personal psychological traits. In particular, she said that the metaphors and terms used to describe both syndromes lead to an association between repressed passion and the physical disease itself. She wrote about the peculiar reversal that "With the modern diseases (once TB, now cancer), the romantic idea that the disease expresses the character is invariably extended to assert that the character causes the disease—because it has not expressed itself. Passion moves inward, striking and blighting the deepest cellular recesses."

Sontag said that the clearest and most truthful way of thinking about diseases is without recourse to metaphor. She believed that wrapping disease in metaphors discouraged, silenced, and shamed patients. Some other writers have disagreed with her, saying that metaphors and other symbolic language help some affected people form meaning out of their experiences.

Synopsis
Illness as Metaphor served as a way for Susan Sontag to express her opinions on the use of metaphors in order to refer to illnesses, with her main focuses being tuberculosis and cancer. The book contrasts the viewpoints and metaphors associated with each disease.  At one point, tuberculosis was seen as a creative disease, leading to healthy people wanting to look as if they were ill with the disease. However, lack of improvement from tuberculosis was usually seen as lack of passion in the individual. Tuberculosis was even seen as a sign of punishment by some religions, such as Christianity, leading the afflicted to believe that they deserved their ailment.

Sontag then made the comparison between the metaphors used to describe tuberculosis and cancer, with cancer being seen in the 1970s as a disease that afflicted people who lacked passion and sensuality, and those who repressed their feelings. Sontag wrote that multiple studies found a link between depression and cancer, which she argued was just a sign of the times and not a reason for the disease, since in previous times physicians found that cancer patients suffered from hyperactivity and hypersensitivity, which were signs of their times.

In the last chapter, Sontag argued that society's disease metaphors cause patients to feel as if society were against them. Her final argument was that metaphors are not useful for patients, since metaphors make patients feel as if their illness was due to their feelings, rather than lack of effective treatment. The most effective way of thinking about illness would be to avoid metaphorical thinking, and to focus on only the physical components and treatment.

Context
Sontag wrote the treatise while being treated for breast cancer. She does not mention her personal experience with cancer in the work, but she addresses it in her related 1988 work, AIDS and Its Metaphors.

At the time that Sontag was writing, the fad in alternative cancer treatment was psychotherapy for the patient's supposed "cancer personality". According to these proponents, patients brought cancer upon themselves by having a resigned, repressed, inhibited personality. By undergoing the often blame-filled psychotherapy offered by some groups, such as the Simonton Center, the patient would overcome cancer by consciously choosing to give up the emotional benefits he or she created the cancer for, and be healed. Others have taken her idea further, showing not that there is a real "cancer" behind the metaphors, but that all we have is metaphor—even in science—to understand the behavior of a disease that remains mysterious.

Publication
The work was originally published as three long essays in the New York Review of Books. Some of the more inflammatory language was slightly toned down for republication. For example, what Sontag originally called the "inimitable looniness" of Wilhelm Reich's language was softened to the "inimitable coherence".

Reception
While one of Sontag's widest read and most celebrated works, Illness as Metaphor has received several negative reviews.
Kirkus Reviews called it "a small, liberating book that could become the cancer patient's Common Sense." The literary critic Denis Donoghue of The New York Times gave the book a negative review, describing it as "a deeply personal book pretending for the sake of decency to be a thesis." He added: Despite this criticism, Donoghue also writes, "If I wanted to see a fine discrimination made, with precisely the right degree of allowance for and against, I wouldn't ask Miss Sontag to supply it. She would be bored by the request. But if I badly wanted to win, at nearly any cost, I would do anything to have Miss Sontag on my side." It is not clear, then, whether Donoghue is disdainful, admiring, or merely jealous of Sontag's persuasive writing.

The literary critic and frequent Sontag detractor Camille Paglia described the book as "clumsy and ponderous, like a graduate-school seminar paper."

Additionally, critics also brought up the argument that metaphoric thinking about diseases hasn't stopped research about diseases from taking place and that humans deal with the reality of their lives through the help of metaphors.

References

Sources
 

1978 non-fiction books
Works by Susan Sontag
Books about metaphors
Books about cancer
Tuberculosis
Social problems in medicine